Paul Baynes (also Bayne, Baines; c. 1573 – 1617) was an English clergyman. Described as a "radical Puritan", he was unpublished  in his lifetime, but more than a dozen works were put out in the five years after he died. His commentary on Ephesians is his best known work; the commentary on the first chapter, itself of 400 pages, appeared in 1618.

Life
He went to school at Wethersfield, Essex. A pupil and follower of William Perkins, he graduated from Christ's College, Cambridge with a B.A. in 1593/4, M.A. in 1597, and was elected a Fellow of Christ's College in 1600, a position he lost in 1608 for non-conformity. He was successor to Perkins as lecturer at the church of St Andrew the Great in Cambridge, opposite Christ's; they were considered the town's leading Puritan preachers.

Influence
Baynes was an important influence on the following generation of English Calvinists, through William Ames, a convert of Perkins, and Richard Sibbes, a convert of Baynes himself. This makes Baynes a major link in a chain of "Puritan worthies": to John Cotton, John Preston, Thomas Shepard and Thomas Goodwin. Ames quoted Baynes: "Beware of a strong head and a cold heart", an idea that would be repeated by Cotton Mather, who was grandson to John Cotton.

Works
Commentary on Ephesians (1618)
A Counterbane against Earthly Carefulnes (1619)
The Diocesans Tryall (1621)
Brief Directions unto a Godly Life (1637)

References

Further reading
Andrew Atherstone, The Silencing of Paul Baynes and Thomas Taylor, Puritan Lecturers at Cambridge'', Notes and Queries (2007) 54, pp. 386–389.

External links

Alumni of Christ's College, Cambridge
1573 births
1617 deaths
17th-century English Puritan ministers
17th-century Calvinist and Reformed theologians
Fellows of Christ's College, Cambridge
English Calvinist and Reformed theologians
16th-century English writers
16th-century male writers
17th-century English writers
17th-century English male writers
English male non-fiction writers